The 2016 Georgia Bulldogs football team represented the University of Georgia in the 2016 NCAA Division I FBS football season. The Bulldogs played their home games at Sanford Stadium. They were members of the Eastern Division of the Southeastern Conference. They were led by first-year head coach Kirby Smart. They finished the season 8–5, 4–4 in SEC play to finish in a three-way tie for second place in the Eastern Division. They were invited to the Liberty Bowl where they defeated TCU.

Previous season
The 2015 Georgia Bulldogs football team was the favorite to win the Eastern Division. The Bulldogs started off the season 4–0 with SEC wins over Vanderbilt 31–14 and South Carolina 52–20, where quarterback Greyson Lambert set an NCAA record for completion percentage in a game with 96% (24/25). On October 3, the #13 Alabama Crimson Tide came to Athens and defeated the Bulldogs 38–10. The next week the Dawgs traveled to Knoxville to face the Tennessee Volunteers. On Georgia's first offensive play of the game, Bulldog's running back Nick Chubb was tackled on the sideline and suffered a season-ending knee injury as Georgia loss their second game of the season. Three weeks later, the Bulldogs suffered their third loss of the season during the World's Largest Outdoor Cocktail Party at EverBank Field in Jacksonville, Florida to the Florida Gators 27–3, where third-string quarterback Faton Bauta started. The Bulldogs finish the regular season on a four-game winning streak including road wins over the Auburn Tigers 20–13 and the Georgia Tech Yellow Jackets 13–7. The day after the Georgia Tech game, head coach Mark Richt was fired after 15 seasons of head coach. Richt had a record of 145–51 as head coach of the Bulldogs. Georgia finished the season with a win over the Penn State Nittany Lions in the Taxslayer Bowl 24–17 under intermediate head coach Bryan McClendon in Jacksonville. The bowl win gave the Bulldogs a final 2015 season record of 10-3, which gave the senior class a total of 40 wins.

Coaching changes
After the 2015 regular season, Georgia's athletic director Greg McGarity fired head coach Mark Richt after 15 seasons with an overall 145–51 record. Richt was replaced with former Georgia football player Kirby Smart, who, at the time, was Alabama's defensive coordinator. Smart played for the Bulldogs from 1995 to 1998 for coaches Ray Goff and Jim Donnan and was defensive coordinator at Alabama from 2008 to 2015 under head coach Nick Saban. Jeremy Pruitt, who was defensive coordinator for Georgia from 2014 to 2015, accepted a position as the defensive coordinator for Alabama to replace Smart.

2016 recruiting class

National Signing Day was on February 3, 2016.

Schedule
Georgia announced its 2016 football schedule on October 29, 2015. The 2016 schedule consisted of 6 home, 4 away, and 2 neutral site games in the regular season. The Bulldogs hosted SEC foes Auburn, Tennessee, and Vanderbilt, and traveled to Kentucky, Missouri, Ole Miss, and South Carolina. Georgia went against Florida in Jacksonville, Florida.

The Bulldogs had hosted three of their four non–conference games, which were against Georgia Tech Yellow Jackets and the North Carolina Tar Heels both from the Atlantic Coast Conference, Louisiana–Lafayette Ragin' Cajuns from the Sun Belt Conference, and Nicholls State Colonels from the Southland Conference.

The game between Georgia and South Carolina had been originally scheduled for October 8, 2016, but was postponed due to Hurricane Matthew and played on October 9, 2016.

Game summaries

vs North Carolina

Nicholls State

at Missouri

at Ole Miss

Tennessee

at South Carolina

Vanderbilt

vs Florida

at Kentucky

Auburn

Louisiana–Lafayette

Georgia Tech

TCU–Liberty Bowl

Roster

Rankings

References

Georgia
Georgia Bulldogs football seasons
Liberty Bowl champion seasons
Georgia Bulldogs football